

Main Cast

Aly (Alianne) of Pirate's Swoop
Protagonist of the duology, Aly is the daughter of George Cooper, (Baron of Pirate's Swoop, second-in-command of Tortall's spies), and Alanna the Lioness of Pirate's Swoop and Olau, lady knight, King's Champion of Tortall, and a living legend. While journeying  to a nearby town after a fight with her mother, who won't allow her to spy like her father, Aly is kidnapped by pirates and sold as a slave to the Balitangs, a noble family of the Copper Isles.

As a slave and maid, she soon discovers and gains access to a rebel conspiracy within the Balitang household, and takes charge as the rebellion's spymaster. At the end of the series she chooses to become the Royal Spymaster for the Isles.  She marries Nawat Crow, and conceives triplets with him by the conclusion of the second book. Their names are Ochobai and Ulasu (girls) and Junim (boy).

Aly is quick, observant, and a skilled knife-wielder. She inherited the magical Sight from her father and its power from her mother. It enables her to see if a person is lying or an immortal, different types of magic, seeing far off things as if they are right in front of her, and a variety of other things. Aly is flirtatious and vivacious by nature, but also knows how to curb her witty tongue when needed.

She grows from the immature girl she is at the beginning of the series as she finds her place in life and her true calling. Despite the seriousness of her task at the Copper Isles, Aly is usually cheerful and her lighthearted attitude endears her to the other Raka—even though they are sometimes exasperated by her.

Her training under her father taught her a variety of useful skills, including lock-picking, hand-to-hand combat (though she loves knives the best), moving silently, observation, and code writing/breaking. She becomes the teacher to her "Pack," a group of elite spies that she utilizes for special missions. They call her "Duani," or boss lady (a sign of respect, despite all being older than her), and she treats them with affection, crying bitterly when some don't survive the overthrowing of the Luarin.

Royal Family

Bronau Jimajen
A Luarin prince, brother of prince Rubinyan. He has a close, romantic relationship with Sarai. He is originally a friend of the Balitangs, but at the end of Trickster's Choice he murders Duke Mequen and is killed by Sarai. Very ambitious and impulsive, he is well liked but not trusted. Despite being raised in the dangerous Jimajen family, he has not learned to curb his tongue. He is also a womanizer and deeply in debt.

Even while he courts Sarai, he sleeps with a different maid every night. Aly mentions that he's the kind of man who would "have her in his lap" if she looked at him the right way, so she keeps her distance. He once courted Duchess Winnamine, but claims that it would have been a "marriage of convenience," to Sarai.

Dunevon Rittevon
King Oron's youngest child, who becomes King after Hazarin. He is only five years old, but is killed in a magically created storm caused by the mages commanded by the boy-king's regents, Princess Imajane and Prince Runbinyan. Dunevon is characterized as a boy who is being forced to grow up too fast. Neglected by the regent, he is forced to stamp everything they propose and then placated with sweets and other rich treats that are harmful to children.

Due to this pampered yet unloving treatment, Dunevon can act extremely spoiled, though Tabur Sibigad, does his best to treat him like a regular boy.

Oron Rittevon
King of the Copper Isles at the beginning of the series, mentally unstable. It is because of his delusions that the Balitangs are exiled. He and his family are said to have a record of producing a mad child every couple generations, as shown with Princess Josiane in the Song of the Lioness series.

He dies in Trickster's Choice, and names his first-born son, Hazarin, as heir. His children all hate each other due to the fact that he, afraid that if they were united they would overthrow him, made their childhoods a constant competition between them.

Rubinyan Jimajen
Luarin brother of Prince Bronau, and husband of Princess Imajane.  Killed by Ulasim and is Ulasim's murderer. More stable than his wife, Rubinyan's weakness is his greed for more land, which leads him to allow his wife to imprison powerful nobles such as Duke Nomru, who then becomes a part of the Luarin conspiracy.

Despite this weakness, Rubinyan is intelligent, practical, and brave. When the rebels attack, he leads his men into battle rather than fleeing or staying behind. Due to Aly's efforts, he and his wife start to have marital problems, though his cool-headed way with Imajane makes breaking them up a difficult task for Aly.

Hazarin Rittevon
King Oron's oldest remaining son, who becomes King after his father's death, before dying of an apoplexy. His ghost reveals to Aly that he hates the Rittevon power games, and he is glad to be free of them. Hazarin thinks that Bronau is the smartest man in the world, and is given to strange drugs and rich foods.

Imajane Rittevon Jimajen
King Oron's only remaining daughter, wife of prince Rubinyan, and regent to King Dunevon, Imajane is described as very beautiful, but in a cold, icy way. She is very cold and power-hungry, and slightly mentally unstable. Coldly calculating, she is intelligent but given to passionate jealousies, and Aly uses this to drive a wedge between Imajane and her husband. When she suspects a woman having an affair with her husband, she sends the lady home "covered in bruises." When the rebellion succeeds, she jumps to her death from her balcony rather than be captured and executed or exiled.

Raka Rebellion

Ulasim Dodeka
Free raka servant, head footman to the Balitang family and general of the raka conspiracy, Ulasim is Junai's father and Ochobu's son. He dies killing Prince Rubinyan in the rebellion. A good friend to Aly, he suspects her secret throughout Trickster's Choice, but grows to respect and like her, though he berates her for not acting professionally when Nawat goes off to fight in the war. He sort of acts as her surrogate father in the absence of George Cooper.

Tall, broad, and muscular, he is well into being middle-aged, (his daughter is in her late twenties), and yet as strong as ever. He is both respectful to his mother and fully aware of her irritable nature and qualities. Ulasim is trusted by the Balitang family, and sometimes treats them like equals despite being their footman.

Chenaol
The Balitang's full-raka cook, a leader in the revolution. She provides the revolution with weapons, and is extremely skilled with weapons herself, able to "tell good steel from bad at a glance and send any knife to the heart of any target." Warm and friendly, she is Aly's first friend among of Balitang servants and keeps any of the Raka from bothering her because of her white skin.

At the end of the duology, she refuses to take a higher position, saying that her place is in the kitchen, and "if anyone wants to talk weapons, they can finds [her] there." Despite this, she is seen ordering weapons and arguing with Fesgao about the number of knives she can give him. She is one of the only core Raka rebellion members to survive and hear Aly's confession about her past.

When she learns that Aly is the daughter of Tortall's unofficial spymaster and the Lioness, her reaction is extremely anticlimactic. She claims that Aly has already proven her loyalties before storming off to berate the delivery boys for getting her flower with rocks stitched at the bottom, and threatening to "take blood."

Fesgao Yubinu
A raka, head of the Balitangs' men-at-arms and the military leader of the rebellion. Quiet and commanding, he becomes a good friend to Aly. A skilled soldier and fighter, he can also be quite good at espionage. Once, in order to show Aly a secret way into the Royal Palace, he pretends to be her lover so that they won't draw suspicion.

He too is one of the only core Raka rebellion members to survive and becomes a very important man as a result. Like Chenaol, he reacts well to Aly's confession of her past.

Ochobu Dodeka
Ulasim's mother and head of the rebel raka mage network known as the Chain.  She and her fellow mages agree to aid the raka conspirators in The Trickster's Choice. Extremely powerful, she originally hates all Luarin but grows to accept, (though never love), some, such as the Balitangs and Aly. Ochobu is a fierce woman with a cutting tongue.

An extremely powerful mage, she rides into battle despite her age and throws her entire life into her spells. As a result, her heart bursts and she dies. She is generally considered to be "The Wise One" in the Prophecy. Aly eventually gets her to think about what she plans to do with the Luarin after the rebellion, and Ochobu admits that she knows that it's impossible to drive them all away, (due to most of the population being mixed-bloods).

Ysul
Second-in-command of the rebellion's raka mage network known as the Chain, assumes command after Ochobu's death. He is mute, but communicates with hand-signals and has just as much power as Ochobu.

Junai Dodeka
A raka woman who acts as Aly's bodyguard.  She is Ulasim's daughter, and dies in the fighting when the rebellion takes place. Though she treats Aly with a professional, closed-off attitude at first, she eventually warms up to Aly enough to express some emotion. Junai worked as a caravan-girl (guard), for a long time and is a very skilled fighter. She is also able to pass herself off as a man when the situation arises.

Proud and defiant, she almost gets herself killed by meeting the eyes of a Luarin guard. When both Dove and Aly yell at her afterwards for being stupid and risking her life, she gives one of her rare smiles before wryly promising to try to be more careful. She is a member of Aly's Pack.

Lokeij
Raka slave, chief hostler for the Balitangs, killed in the fighting at Tanair. He is sharp, suspecting Aly's secrets, though he never acts upon them. He is able to ride like a young man, bareback, despite his age.

Balitang Family

Mequen Balitang
Duke, fourth in line to the throne, father of Sarai, Dove, Petranne, and Elsren, married to duchess Winnamine.  His first wife, Duchess Sarugani, was a member of the raka nobility and descended from the original raka royal family. Mequen is fair, and very noble. He never mistreats his servants, and doesn't allow anyone else to do so. His sense of nobility and fair play gets him killed, for he refuses to mistrust Bronau when the prince comes to him after being exiled.

He treats Aly and the other slaves well, and is a genuinely good man. His people love him, and his death is partly why Aly decides to stay in the Copper Isles.

Winnamine Fonfala Balitang
Luarin duchess married to Duke Mequen.  Has two children by Mequen: Petranne and Elsren. Was the best friend of Mequen's first wife, Duchess Sarugani, and was briefly courted by Prince Bronau Jimajen before her marriage to the duke. Winnamine is gentle and gracious, but can also be very resilient and strong. She learns to use the bow and gains her stepdaughters' trust and respect.

Dovasary Balitang (Dove)
Dove is the younger of Duke Mequen Balitang's two half-raka daughters by his first marriage.  She is quiet, observant, and very intelligent. Dove is also extremely mature, mingling with people of all classes and instinctively knowing how to behave before the royal family and court. Much more patient than her sister, Sarai, she understands the wisdom of waiting to speak and has a variety of intellectual interests and talents, including astronomy and chess. Dove is also skilled with the bow.

Saraiyu Balitang (Sarai)
Sarai is the beautiful but impetuous eldest daughter of Duke Mequen Balitang.  She is stubborn about certain 
things, and not as calm as her sister Dove. Sarai is much more openly passionate than Dove, and less patient. She speaks her mind even when it endangers herself and her family, but understands her duty to her family. Though she has talent with swordplay, she refuses to continue with it after killing Bronau in Trickster's Choice. She disgraces her family by eloping to Carthak with Zaimid Hetnim rather than marry King Dunevon.

Sarugani Temaida Balitang
First wife of Duke Mequen, and mother to Sarai and Dove. Before her death from a riding accident, was a member of one of the few remaining full-raka noble families and the last of the raka royal line. She is described as having "too much heart and not enough head," as well as a brilliant rider and best friends with Winnamine Fonfala, despite her status as a Raka and Winnamine's status as a luarin.

Nuritin Balitang
Duke Mequen's bossy and overbearing luarin aunt; head of the Balitang family and the luarin conspiracy. She is extremely sharp and aware of the dangers and instability of the Rittevan court, skillfully navigating the Balitang family so that it is never humiliated and always one step ahead.

Petranne Balitang
Duke Mequen's third, and only full-blood, luarin daughter. She is Elsren's sister and loves to hear Aly tell stories about Tortall.

Elsren Balitang
Duke Mequen's youngest luarin child and heir to Dunevon's throne as a result of Mequen's death. He is killed in the same storm as Dunevon. In Trickster's Choice, Aly is responsible for looking after him and Petranne, and though he is disobedient at first, he grows to love her and enjoy her stories.

Others

Ferdolin Tomang
A high-ranking luarin noble, and one of Sarai's many admirers. He is shown to be impulsive and rude boy who treats the Raka like an inferior race, though one of Sarai's friends point out his "lovely muscles." He loses an eye during the Raka rebellion and seemingly grows more mature.

Kyprioth the Trickster
Chief of the trickster gods, former patron of the Copper Isles, sea god for the oceans around the Copper Isles.  Overthrown by his brother Mithros and sister the Great Mother Goddess 300 years prior to the beginning of the series, he enlists Aly to help him get it back. The Raka rebellion is the physical manifestation of his battle with his siblings, as the gods get power from their servants' victories. Though he seems humorous and light-hearted, Kyprioth can be very intense and is a menace when enraged. His presence is enough to send anyone with Raka blood to their knees.

Nawat Crow
A crow who turned himself into a man.  He has a romantic relationship with Aly through most of the series, but does not truly find his place in the world of men until near the end of Trickster's Queen. Nawat is shown to be extremely innocent, not knowing the proper decorum for human beings. He is extremely attractive and popular with women, as well as gifted with physical abilities that are beyond any humans. For example, he can keep up with a horse by running and leap ten feet up into a tree, as well as catch arrows, spears, and knives. He works as a fletcher and a warrior, as well as Aly's main link to the crows.  At the end of the series he and Aly are married and are expecting a baby.

Taybur Sibigat
Head of the King's Guard.  He aids the raka conspiracy after the death of King Dunevon, whom he loved with all his heart. Taybur is handsome, extremely quick, and much like a male counterpart of Aly. He suspects she is a spy but does not know of the Raka rebellion, and because of his rivalry with Topabaw does not turn her in. They develop a lightly flirtatious friendship based on their ability to relate on an intellectual level. Both are seen to enjoy their banter extremely.
At one point before the King's death he discovers the Darking she left in the Dunevon's room and informs her that he does not care if she spies on him but desires a place where Dunevon can cry and rage unobserved. This shows that he views his devotion to the King much more than his

Duke Lohearn Mantawu
A.k.a. Topabaw, a Crown spymaster who is executed by the regents as a result of Aly's spy work. He is shown to be cruel, sloppy, and ruthless. He has been spymaster so long that most people don't remember a time before him.

Tamora Pierce characters